Achintee is a location in Glen Nevis in the Highland council area of Scotland. It is around 2 km south-east of Fort William and just to the east of the River Nevis.

Achintee is the starting point for the "Mountain Path", the most popular route up Ben Nevis. The Ben Nevis Inn is within Achintee, at the end of a minor road.

The name Achintee is from the Gaelic for "the field of the seat".

References

Populated places in Lochaber
Fort William, Highland